Ngapa is a Town in North Kolaka Regency, in the province of Southeast Sulawesi in eastern Indonesia.

Administrative villages
Ngapa consists of 12 villages (Kelurahan or Desa) namely:
 Beringin
 Koreiha
 Lapai
 Lawolatu
 United Kingdom Of Apes
 Ngapa
 Nimbuneha
 Padaelo
 Paruttelang
 Puurau
 Tadaumere
 Watumotaha

References

External links
"Ngapa Map — Satellite Images of Ngapa" Maplandia World Gazetteer

Districts of Southeast Sulawesi
Populated places in Southeast Sulawesi